The Hana Highway (colloquially referred to as The Road to Hana) is a  stretch of Hawaii Routes 36 and 360 which connects Kahului to the town of Hana in east Maui. To the east of Kalepa Bridge, the highway continues to Kipahulu as Hawaii Route 31 (the Piilani Highway). There are approximately 620 curves along Route 360 from just east of Kahului to Hana, almost all of it through lush, tropical rainforest. Many of the concrete and steel bridges date back to 1910 and all but one are still in use. That one bridge, badly damaged by erosion, has been replaced by a portable steel ACROW or Bailey bridge erected by the United States Army Corps of Engineers.

In August 2000, the highway was designated as the Hana Millennium Legacy Trail by President Bill Clinton, with the trail start designated in Pāia.  The Hana Highway was listed on the National Register of Historic Places on June 15, 2001.

Route description 
Hana Highway consists of Hawaii Routes 36 and 360. Route 36 is a mixture of urban street, divided highway, and high-speed rural highway. Route 360 is a narrow and winding mountain road. Mileposts in tourist guides refer to mile markers on Route 360, not Route 36.

Route 36 begins in Kahului and the junction of Routes 32 and 311, and the road named Hana Highway begins one block east. The highway runs east as a four-lane divided highway, intersecting with Routes 380, 3800 which serve Kahului Airport to the north and connect to Maalaea and West Maui to the south. A short distance east, it intersects Route 37, which serves Haleakala to the south. East of this point, the highway becomes a two-lane rural highway, passing through Pa'ia and Ha'iku. Highway 36 ends at Route 365 east of Haiku, while the Hana Highway continues as Route 360.

Highway 360 is a narrow, winding, and low speed mountain highway. Its initial junction is marked as Mile Zero at Route 36, and the highway runs in a southeasterly direction toward Hana. This highway includes numerous one-lane stretches of roadway, including one-lane bridges. The road provides access to the community of Keanae, Wailua, and Nahiku, arriving at Hana at mile 34. The highway then turns to the west and continues as Route 31.

Tourism
The Hana Highway is a popular tourist attraction in Maui.  Guidebooks often devote large sections to traveling the highway leading to the eastern side of Maui, documenting the many waterfalls and attractions that can be found along the way.  Some of these attractions lie within or through private property and will often have "no trespassing" signs posted or even signs claiming that the attraction does not exist. All beaches in Hawaii are public. Some guidebooks document the "keep out" areas and ways past barbed wire fences and locked gates to reach attractions.

Beyond the town of Hana, the Hana Highway becomes Hawaii State Road 330 and leads to the Oheo Gulch where the Seven Sacred Pools are located within the Kipahulu Area of the Haleakala National Park.

Occasionally the dirt road past Route 31 is closed to traffic due to landslides. However, although it is somewhat rough in places, it is by no means a daunting or particularly dangerous road if taken slowly.

Scenic turnouts abound, including one for Wailua Falls near the Seven Sacred Pools in Oheo.

History
In the sixteenth century, Maui's King Pi'ilani conquered East Maui and drew Hana into his political sphere. Pi'ilani built the Alaloa, the "long road," from West Maui, a road on which travelers reportedly swung themselves over East Maui's rushing streams with ropes made of vines. Later, Piilani's son, Kihapiilani, extended the Alaloa into the Hana District.
Modern road construction to Hana began in the 1870s, with an unpaved road built to facilitate the construction of the Hämäkua Ditch. Part of The East Maui Irrigation System, the Hämäkua Ditch brought water from the rainforests of Haleakalā to semi-arid central Maui to support the sugarcane industry.

Road construction continued in the early 1900s and was extended piecemeal until the full road to Hana was officially opened on December 18, 1926. Construction of bridges continued through the 1930s and the road was not completely paved until the 1960s.

Major intersections

Gallery

See also
List of bridges documented by the Historic American Engineering Record in Hawaii

References

External links

Historic American Engineering Record in Hawaii
Historic trails and roads in Hawaii
Roads in Hawaii
Historic districts on the National Register of Historic Places in Hawaii
Transportation in Maui County, Hawaii
Roads on the National Register of Historic Places in Hawaii
National Register of Historic Places in Maui County, Hawaii
National Register of Historic Places in national parks
Haleakalā National Park
Hawaii Register of Historic Places